Al-Ahmadiyah Madrasa is a madrasah complex in old Aleppo, Syria.

See also
 Al-Firdaws Madrasa
 Al-Sultaniyah Madrasa
 Al-Uthmaniyah Madrasa
 Al-Zahiriyah Madrasa
 Ancient City of Aleppo
 Khusruwiyah Mosque

References

School buildings completed in 1724
Ottoman architecture in Aleppo
Madrasas in Aleppo
1724 establishments in the Ottoman Empire